Muhammad Sayful Alam (7 March 1934 – 14 January 1997) was a Bangladeshi politician and teacher. He was a member of the East Pakistan Legislative Assembly. He had made extensive contributions to the overall development of Gowainghat Upazila.

Early life and education 
Sayful Alam was born on 7 March 1934, to a Bengali Muslim family in Purnanagar, Gowainghat, located in the Sylhet district of the British Raj. The family may have originally been from the nearby village of Rautgram in West Alirgaon Union. He passed his Intermediate of Arts in 1954, and earned his Bachelor of Arts two years later.

Career 
Alam began his career as a teacher at the Gowainghat High School for two years. His entrance to politics started at the Basic Democracy elections held in 1959 under Ayub Khan's military rule. He became a member initially, and then later the uncontested chairman of the constituency. Alam participated in the May 1962 Basic Democracy elections, becoming a member of the East Pakistan Legislative Assembly, representing the PE-113 (Sylhet-IV) constituency. According to Ehsanul Haq Jasim, Alam was convicted in a murder case eighteen months later and his seat became void. A by-election was held with Khandakar Abdul Jalil being nominated. He was later found to be innocent. Gowainghat was made an upazila (sub-district) in 1983 as part of the President of Bangladesh Hussain Muhammad Ershad's decentralisation programme and Alam was appointed as the inaugural chairman of the Gowainghat Upazila Council in 1985. Alam was also the elected founding chairman of the undivided Alirgaon Union.

Death and legacy 
Alam died on 14 January 1967 and was buried in the Purnanagar Graveyard. He had several children including Muazzam Husayn Ripon. In 1999, the President of Bangladesh Hussain Muhammad Ershad visited Alam's grave along with Abdul Hannan and MP Nasir Ahmad of Derai-Sullah. The condition of the graveyard is presently not well preserved.

References 

People of East Pakistan
People from Gowainghat Upazila
Bengali politicians
20th-century Bengalis
1997 deaths
1934 births